The eye-ringed thistletail (Asthenes palpebralis) is a species of bird in the family Furnariidae. It is endemic to central Peru.

Its natural habitat is subtropical or tropical high-altitude grassland.

References

eye-ringed thistletail
Birds of the Peruvian Andes
Endemic birds of Peru
eye-ringed thistletail
Taxonomy articles created by Polbot